Maldaha Assembly constituency is an assembly constituency in Maldah district in the Indian state of West Bengal. It is reserved for scheduled castes.

Overview
As per orders of the Delimitation Commission, No. 50 Maldaha Assembly constituency (SC) covers Old Malda Municipality, Old Malda, Narhatta gram panchayat of English Bazar community development block, and Aiho, Rishipur and Sreerampur gram panchayats of Habibpur community development block.

Maldah Assembly constituency is part of No. 7 Maldaha Uttar (Lok Sabha constituency). It was earlier part of Malda (Lok Sabha constituency).

Members of Legislative Assembly

Election results

2021
In the 2021 election, Gopal Chandra Saha of BJP defeated his nearest rival, Ujjwal Kumar Chowdhury of Trinamool Congress.

2016
In the 2016 election, Bhupendra Nath Halder of Congress defeated his nearest rival, Dulal Sarkar of Trinamool Congress.

2011
In the 2011 election, Bhupendra Nath Halder of Congress defeated his nearest rival, Rahul Ranjan Das of CPI(M).

.# Swing based on Congress+Trinamool Congress vote percentages taken together in 2006.

1977–2006
In 2006 and 2001 state assembly elections, Subhendu Chowdhury of CPI(M) won the Maldaha (SC) assembly seat defeating his nearest rivals Bhupendra Nath Halder of Congress and Phani Bhusan Roy of Trinamool Congress respectively. Contests in most years were multi cornered but only winners and runners are being mentioned. Phani Bhusan Roy of Congress defeated Subhendu Chowdhury of CPI(M) in 1996. Subhendu Chowdhury of CPI(M) defeated Phani Bhusan Roy of Congress in 1991 and 1987. Phani Bhusan Roy of Congress defeated Subhendu Chowdhury of CPI(M) in 1982. Subhendu Chowdhury of CPI(M) defeated Phani Bhusan Roy of Congress in 1977.

1951–1972
Mahammad Gafurur Rahaman of Congress won in 1972, 1971 and 1969. S.Mia of Congress won in 1967. Dharanidhar Sarkar of CPI won in 1962. Malda was a joint seat in 1957 and 1951. Nikunja Behari Gupta and Matla Murmu, both of Congress, won in 1957. Nikunja Behari Gupta of Congress and Raipada Das, Independent, won in independent India's first election in 1951.

References

Assembly constituencies of West Bengal
Politics of Malda district
Maldah